Garbanzol is a flavanonol, a type of flavonoid. It can be found in the seed of Cicer arietinum (Bengal gram), in the shoot of Phaseolus lunatus (butter bean) and in the root of Pterocarpus marsupium (Bastard teak).

References 

Flavanonols